Oru Kanniyum Moonu Kalavaanikalum is a 2014 Indian Tamil-language magic realism comedy film written and directed by  Chimbu Deven, starring Arulnithi, Bindu Madhavi, Ashrita Shetty and Bagavathi Perumal. The music comprises three tracks composed by Sankaran Natarajan, while S. R. Kathir handles the camera. The film was shot in Chennai, in and around Saidapet, Anna Nagar, Besant Nagar and Royapuram. The theme of this film was inspired by Run Lola Run, which Chimbudevan acknowledges in the end credits. The film earned mixed reviews and was an average grosser at the box office.

Plot
The film begins with Naradar trying to meet lord Brahma; he meets Brahma just in time as Brahma informs Naradar that he would have vanished if Naradar was late by a minute; Naradar opposes this saying that Naradar meeting Brahma is bound to happen by fate no matter, if late by a minute. As its already written in fate. Brahma opposes this and they both get into argument. They go to Lord Shiva for settling this. Shiva informs Naradar that fate of humans gets changed every minute. Naradar challenge lord Shiva to prove this. hence Shiva shows a screen consisting of human faces and asks Naradar to choose one. Naradar chooses Tamil, the hero of this film. Lord Shiva tells Naradar that he would now demonstrate the fate of Tamil changes upon time and the film unfolds into the main picture.

Cast

Production
After the release of his previous directorial Irumbu Kottai Murattu Singam, Chimbudevan announced that his next film will be titled as Mareesan with Dhanush playing the lead role, but due to budget problems, the project got shelved. There were rumours that he would direct the sequel of his debut film Imsai Arasan 23m Pulikesi was also proved false.

Critical reception
Baradwaj Rangan wrote, "As much as we want to laud the ambition that results in something like Oru Kanniyum being attempted in Tamil, we also realise that these films are inherently compromised by Tamil-cinema considerations — the inevitability of the interval, the fear of things getting too serious, and the need to pad out the narrative to nearly two-and-a-half hours.  The Times of India gave the film 3.5 stars out of 5 and wrote, "The first hour of OKMK is a terrific, nail-biting black comedy cum thriller. But, suddenly, the fizz goes away from the film as we are shown reiterations of the same set of circumstances playing out differently. And, for a film that is all about the value of time, the director takes a rather longer time to tell this story". Sify wrote, "Chimbudevan is imaginative and this film is sure to appeal to someone seeking a refreshing change. Chimbudevan’s script and Arulnithi’s cool performance is what makes the film work".

Rediff gave it 2.5 stars out of 5 and wrote, "Oru Kanniyum Moonu Kalavaanikalum is in Chimbu Deven’s trademark style, filled with quirky characters, fantastical elements, and loads of comedy and satire. The film is not your average run-of-the-mill romantic comedy and may not appeal to all, but the director does deserve credit for attempting a different concept". Behindwoods gave it also 2.5 stars out of 5 and wrote, "Nice concept, great detailing but lacks the enough laughs to keep you engaged". Indiaglitz wrote, "Be it the story or be it the concept, everything about the movie is a new idea. But what makes the film stand out is its screenplay and well conceived direction. Given that the skeleton story remains unaltered, it is natural that repetition may jar or bore. But this is where Chimbu Devan stamps his mark yet again, as all of the two and half hours is unique and entertaining".

Critics pointed out that the film resembled the German film Run Lola Run by Tom Tykwer. Chimbu Deven has also acknowledged the film in the end credits.

Soundtrack
The music is composed by Natarajan Sankaran of Moodar Koodam fame.

 "July Madham" - Naresh Iyer
 "Moonu Kodi" - Manikka Vinayagam, Chinnaponnu
 "Bachelor Enakke" - Gaana Bala, Premgi Amaren
 "Theme Breeze"
 "Theme Marriage"
 "Theme Thunder"

References

External links
 

2014 romantic comedy films
2014 films
2010s fantasy comedy films
2010s Tamil-language films
Films directed by Chimbu Deven
Indian fantasy comedy films
Indian romantic comedy films